Nawfal Shamoun (born November 28, 1968 in Basra, Iraq) is an Assyrian singer and pianist who has produced ballads and patriotic music in the Assyrian language.

Early life
Nawfal was born in Basra, in the south of Iraq, on November 28, 1968, only a few months after his father died in a car crash between Baghdad and Basra. After that, his family (mother, three sisters, and two brothers) moved to Mosul. Nawfal is a member of the Barwari tribe.

When he was 6 years old, his older brother Naji gave him a birthday gift, a melodica, which he credits to peaking his initial interest in music. His playing focused on the music and songs of the singer Fairuz. He started playing in local churches in Mosul. He also began to perform with bands in the year 1984. He joined his first band called "Nice Band". The members were "Zaya" on guitar, "David" on lead guitar, "Adnan" on bass guitar, "George" on drums and "Nawfal" on keyboard.

Nawfal has since played with entertainers and musicians such as "Kadim Al Sahir" in 1989 , in one of the most noteworthy hotel's in Mosul- the Ninevah Oberoy, with his other band called "Ninevah Band". Ninevah consisted of "Saif" on guitar, "Nabeel" on bass guitar and "Ayad" on drums. Nawfal was a main member in many bands starting with "Nice Hand", and many other bands like "Life Band" with Hazim on Bass and Waleed on Drums, "Lovers Band" with Odisho on Guitar and Zaya on Bass and also Moris on Drums, "Ninevah Band" and finally "Ishtar Band" with "Moris" on drums, "Ninos" on bass and "Bashar" on percussion. "Ishtar Band" used to play in AL SALAM Hall which was managed by Nawfal's close friend and artist Mr. Nabeel Zaya in Mosul.

Eventually, Nawfal moved to Amman, Jordan. He started to perform with his friend Saif on guitar, at a five star flat hotel called "TURINO" for a one-year contract. Nawfal then moved to Germany in 1996 where he settled in Wiesbaden to build and improve on his professional musical career. Nawfal has now become a respected musician, singer and composer in Germany and the surrounding countries where he performs in small, medium and large venues.

Nawfal moved to Sweden, Gothenburg, in the year of 2008 after he got married, and he is still performing in weddings and parties all over Europe.

Career
In the year 2000 Nawfal released a live album with many Assyrian songs that he performed, alongside Bashar, a close friend of his, who worked on percussion and backing vocals. In the year 2004 Nawfal produced a new album which included12 tracks of different styles and with varied musicians, songwriters and singers, such as r Ashur Bet Sargis as a songwriter, Yousib Menashi as a songwriter from Sydney, a duet with Linda George and a duet with Daniel Afram in another song and also Music producers like Hilal from the Netherlands, Travelian from Canada, Ammar Saleh, Charbel Khayo and Senol Avci from Germany and many others covering the full spectrum of Assyrian and International music.

2015 Nawfal Shamoun performed at the Gothenburg Opera with International choir of 50 singers his song Nina w Nineveh For the Swedish red cross .

Later in September, they were invited to Stockholm circus theatre to perform his same song with Benny Anderson of ABBA on piano and Björn announcement of the song. This was a very highlight point in his musical career. These songs were recorded at Gothenburg Opera with twenty-two Orchestra musicians plus the international choir of fifty people for the Swedish Red Cross benefit.

Projects
Nawfal released his 3rd studio album, 'Musicpotamia', in 2014.

Released online 4th studio album ‘Nineveh Forever ‘ 2018.

Personal and professional facts
Nawfal can play the piano, keyboard and other musical instruments
Nawfal has three sisters and two brothers
Nawfal's first instrument was a melodica which was given to him by his older brother Naji
Nawfal's first band was called "Nice Band"
Nawfal can sing in multiple languages, including Aramaic, Arabic, Greek, Persian & Turkish
Nawfal was born in Basra, Iraq
Nawfal's usual place of residence: Gothenburg, Sweden
Nawfal has made 4 albums.

References

qeenatha.com

External links

Platform Aram: Nawfal Shamoun
Qeenatha.com: Nawfal Shamoun Working On A New Album
Nawfal Shamoun Music
Skygate Productions

1968 births
Living people
Assyrian musicians
20th-century Iraqi male singers
Syriac-language singers
People from Basra
People from Gothenburg
Iraqi emigrants to Sweden
21st-century Iraqi male singers